Banqiao Power Station, also known as Nanjing Thermal Power Station and Jiangsu Nanre Coal Power Plant, is a coal-fired power station in the Jiangsu province of China, located near the city of Nanjing.

Banqiao Power Station is owned by China Resources Power Holdings Co Ltd. It has been active since 2004 and has a power capacity of 830 Megawatt. Its operational units consist of 2 × 135 MW and 2 × 330 MW.

See also

 List of coal power stations
 List of largest power stations in the world
 List of power stations in China

References

Coal-fired power stations in China